The Banting Medal, officially the Banting Medal for Scientific Achievement, is an annual award conferred by the American Diabetes Association (ADA), which is the highest award of ADA. Inaugurated in 1941, the prize is given in memory of Sir Frederick Banting, a key discoverer of insulin and its therapeutic use.

Laureates 

 1941: Elliott P. Joslin
 1942: William Muhlberg
 1943: Fred W. Hipwell
 1944: Leonard G. Rowntree
 1946: Bernardo Alberto Houssay, Hans Christian Hagedorn, Robert Daniel Lawrence, Eugene Lindsay Opie, University of Toronto
 1947: George Henry Alexander Clowes
 1948: Rollin Turner Woodyatt
 1949: Herbert M. Evans, Frederick Madison Allen
 1950: Frank George Young
 1951: Cyril Norman Hugh Long
 1952: Robert Russell Bensley
 1953: Shields Warren, Walter R. Campbell, Andrew Almon Fletcher
 1954: Henry Hallett Dale
 1955: Carl Ferdinand Cori, Eugene Floyd DuBois
 1956: William C. Stadie, Louis Harry Newburgh
 1957: DeWitt Stetten Jr., John Raymond Murlin
 1958: Jerome W. Conn, William H. Olmsted
 1959: George Widmer Thorn, Elexious Thompson Bell
 1960: Priscilla White, James Collip
 1961: Rachmiel Levine
 1962: Albert Baird Hastings
 1963: Bernardo Alberto Houssay, Garfield G. Duncan
 1964: Francis Dring Wetherill Lukens, Moses Barron, Joseph Pierre Hoet, Leland S. McKittrick, Peter J. Moloney, David A. Scott, Haim Ernst Wertheimer
 1965: Solomon Aaron Berson, I. Arthur Mirsky
 1966: Robert Hardin Williams
 1967: Alexander Marble
 1968: Arthur R. Colwell
 1969: Earl Wilbur Sutherland, Robert L. Jackson
 1970: Paul Eston Lacy
 1971: George F. Cahill Jr., William R. Kirtley
 1972: Dorothy Crowfoot Hodgkin
 1973: Arnold Lazarow
 1974: Albert Renold
 1975: Roger H. Unger
 1976: Donald F. Steiner
 1977: David M. Kipnis
 1978: Stefan S. Fajans
 1979: Charles Rawlinson Park
 1980: Norbert Freinkel
 1981: Lelio Orci
 1982: Jesse Roth
 1983: Arthur H. Rubenstein
 1984: Daniel W. Foster
 1985: Bjorn Nerup
 1986: Albert I. Winegrad
 1987: Joseph Larner
 1988: Gerald Reaven
 1989: Ora Rosen
 1990: Daniel Porte Jr.
 1991: Mladen Vranic
 1992: Gian Franco Bottazzo
 1993: C. Ronald Kahn
 1994: Philip E. Cryer
 1995: Franz M. Matschinsky
 1996: Peter H. Bennett
 1997: Alan D. Cherrington
 1998: Jerrold M. Olefsky
 1999: Anthony Cerami
 2000: Michael P. Czech
 2001: John Denis McGarry
 2002: Samuel W. Cushman
 2003: Aldo A. Rossini
 2004: Michael A. Brownlee
 2005: Jeffrey Scott Flier
 2006: Richard N. Bergman
 2007: Robert Stanley Sherwin
 2008: Ralph A. DeFronzo
 2009: George Eisenbarth
 2010: Robert A. Rizza
 2011: Barbara E. Corkey
 2012: Bruce M. Spiegelman
 2013: Graeme I. Bell
 2014: Daniel J. Drucker
 2015: Philipp E. Scherer
 2016: Barbara Kahn
 2017: Domenico Accili
 2018: Gerald I. Shulman
 2019: Stephen P. O'Rahilly
 2020: Ele Ferrannini
 2021: Jens J. Holst

References

External links 

 
 Banting lectures

Awards established in 1949
Academic awards